Gleno is a city in East Timor,  to the southwest of Dili, the national capital. It is in the suco of Riheu (Administrative post Ermera). Gleno has a population of 8,133 (2010).

Gleno is the capital of the municipality of Ermera.

Being near the national capital, Gleno suffered during the intimidation campaign around the time of the referendum for East Timorese independence in 1999.

Climate
Gleno has a tropical savanna climate (Köppen Aw), bordering on a tropical monsoon climate (Am), moderated by elevation. The dry season peaks in August and September, whilst the wet season extends from November to May with a peak from December to February. Gleno is substantially cooler and much wetter than Dili, which receives less than half as much rainfall.

Other places
Gleno is also a small village in County Antrim, Northern Ireland.

References

External links

Populated places in East Timor
Ermera Municipality